The Slavgorod constituency (No.42) is a Russian legislative constituency covering the entirety of Altai Krai. Previously the constituency covered western Altai Krai, however, in 2016 the constituency was pushed to the east to take part of Barnaul.

Members elected

Election results

1993

|-
! colspan=2 style="background-color:#E9E9E9;text-align:left;vertical-align:top;" |Candidate
! style="background-color:#E9E9E9;text-align:left;vertical-align:top;" |Party
! style="background-color:#E9E9E9;text-align:right;" |Votes
! style="background-color:#E9E9E9;text-align:right;" |%
|-
|style="background-color:"|
|align=left|Sergey Opyonyshev
|align=left|Agrarian Party
|
|49.36%
|-
| colspan="5" style="background-color:#E9E9E9;"|
|- style="font-weight:bold"
| colspan="3" style="text-align:left;" | Total
| 
| 100%
|-
| colspan="5" style="background-color:#E9E9E9;"|
|- style="font-weight:bold"
| colspan="4" |Source:
|
|}

1995

|-
! colspan=2 style="background-color:#E9E9E9;text-align:left;vertical-align:top;" |Candidate
! style="background-color:#E9E9E9;text-align:left;vertical-align:top;" |Party
! style="background-color:#E9E9E9;text-align:right;" |Votes
! style="background-color:#E9E9E9;text-align:right;" |%
|-
|style="background-color:"|
|align=left|Vladimir Vernigora
|align=left|Agrarian Party
|
|32.65%
|-
|style="background-color:"|
|align=left|Aleksey Askalonov
|align=left|Independent
|
|17.20%
|-
|style="background-color:"|
|align=left|Viktor Popov
|align=left|Independent
|
|9.55%
|-
|style="background-color:"|
|align=left|Aleksandr Gelmel
|align=left|Independent
|
|7.11%
|-
|style="background-color:"|
|align=left|Sergey Tevonyan
|align=left|Independent
|
|6.45%
|-
|style="background-color:"|
|align=left|Mikhail Solovyev
|align=left|Liberal Democratic Party
|
|5.77%
|-
|style="background-color:"|
|align=left|Nikolay Bondarchuk
|align=left|Education — Future of Russia
|
|4.06%
|-
|style="background-color:#3A46CE"|
|align=left|Albina Kolobova
|align=left|Democratic Choice of Russia – United Democrats
|
|3.81%
|-
|style="background-color:"|
|align=left|Andrey Nosachev
|align=left|Independent
|
|2.96%
|-
|style="background-color:"|
|align=left|Arkady Yenner
|align=left|Kedr
|
|2.44%
|-
|style="background-color:#000000"|
|colspan=2 |against all
|
|6.36%
|-
| colspan="5" style="background-color:#E9E9E9;"|
|- style="font-weight:bold"
| colspan="3" style="text-align:left;" | Total
| 
| 100%
|-
| colspan="5" style="background-color:#E9E9E9;"|
|- style="font-weight:bold"
| colspan="4" |Source:
|
|}

1999

|-
! colspan=2 style="background-color:#E9E9E9;text-align:left;vertical-align:top;" |Candidate
! style="background-color:#E9E9E9;text-align:left;vertical-align:top;" |Party
! style="background-color:#E9E9E9;text-align:right;" |Votes
! style="background-color:#E9E9E9;text-align:right;" |%
|-
|style="background-color:"|
|align=left|Ivan Aparin
|align=left|Independent
|
|53.41%
|-
|style="background-color:#3B9EDF"|
|align=left|Sergey Tevonyan
|align=left|Fatherland – All Russia
|
|18.44%
|-
|style="background-color:"|
|align=left|Aleksandr Strikha
|align=left|Yabloko
|
|7.64%
|-
|style="background-color:"|
|align=left|Aleksandr Grebenshchikov
|align=left|Independent
|
|5.64%
|-
|style="background-color:"|
|align=left|Mikhail Solovyev
|align=left|Independent
|
|3.94%
|-
|style="background-color:#000000"|
|colspan=2 |against all
|
|9.20%
|-
| colspan="5" style="background-color:#E9E9E9;"|
|- style="font-weight:bold"
| colspan="3" style="text-align:left;" | Total
| 
| 100%
|-
| colspan="5" style="background-color:#E9E9E9;"|
|- style="font-weight:bold"
| colspan="4" |Source:
|
|}

2003

|-
! colspan=2 style="background-color:#E9E9E9;text-align:left;vertical-align:top;" |Candidate
! style="background-color:#E9E9E9;text-align:left;vertical-align:top;" |Party
! style="background-color:#E9E9E9;text-align:right;" |Votes
! style="background-color:#E9E9E9;text-align:right;" |%
|-
|style="background-color:"|
|align=left|Andrey Knorr
|align=left|United Russia
|
|32.46%
|-
|style="background-color:"|
|align=left|Sergey Serov
|align=left|Agrarian Party
|
|31.38%
|-
|style="background-color:"|
|align=left|Aleksey Sarychev
|align=left|Independent
|
|13.09%
|-
|style="background-color:"|
|align=left|Yury Toropkin
|align=left|Liberal Democratic Party
|
|4.83%
|-
|style="background-color:#164C8C"|
|align=left|Anna Poddubnaya
|align=left|United Russian Party Rus'
|
|3.88%
|-
|style="background-color:#1042A5"|
|align=left|Vladimir Kolotov
|align=left|Union of Right Forces
|
|2.31%
|-
|style="background-color:"|
|align=left|Sergey Labaznikov
|align=left|The Greens
|
|1.96%
|-
|style="background-color:#000000"|
|colspan=2 |against all
|
|8.61%
|-
| colspan="5" style="background-color:#E9E9E9;"|
|- style="font-weight:bold"
| colspan="3" style="text-align:left;" | Total
| 
| 100%
|-
| colspan="5" style="background-color:#E9E9E9;"|
|- style="font-weight:bold"
| colspan="4" |Source:
|
|}

2016

|-
! colspan=2 style="background-color:#E9E9E9;text-align:left;vertical-align:top;" |Candidate
! style="background-color:#E9E9E9;text-align:leftt;vertical-align:top;" |Party
! style="background-color:#E9E9E9;text-align:right;" |Votes
! style="background-color:#E9E9E9;text-align:right;" |%
|-
|style="background-color:"|
|align=left|Ivan Loor
|align=left|United Russia
|
|40.03%
|-
|style="background:"| 
|align=left|Aleksandr Terentyev
|align=left|A Just Russia
|
|20.35%
|-
|style="background-color:"|
|align=left|Yevgenia Borovikova
|align=left|Liberal Democratic Party
|
|13.84%
|-
|style="background-color:"|
|align=left|Pyotr Ponarin
|align=left|Communist Party
|
|12.27%
|-
|style="background:"| 
|align=left|Ivan Fursenko
|align=left|Communists of Russia
|
|3.06%
|-
|style="background:"| 
|align=left|Aleksandr Kondrov
|align=left|Yabloko
|
|2.57%
|-
|style="background:"| 
|align=left|Yury Bogdanov
|align=left|Party of Growth
|
|2.16%
|-
|style="background-color:"|
|align=left|Vladimir Kirillov
|align=left|The Greens
|
|1.76%
|-
| colspan="5" style="background-color:#E9E9E9;"|
|- style="font-weight:bold"
| colspan="3" style="text-align:left;" | Total
| 
| 100%
|-
| colspan="5" style="background-color:#E9E9E9;"|
|- style="font-weight:bold"
| colspan="4" |Source:
|
|}

2021

|-
! colspan=2 style="background-color:#E9E9E9;text-align:left;vertical-align:top;" |Candidate
! style="background-color:#E9E9E9;text-align:left;vertical-align:top;" |Party
! style="background-color:#E9E9E9;text-align:right;" |Votes
! style="background-color:#E9E9E9;text-align:right;" |%
|-
|style="background-color:"|
|align=left|Ivan Loor (incumbent)
|align=left|United Russia
|
|38.26%
|-
|style="background-color:"|
|align=left|Anna Levashova
|align=left|Communist Party
|
|20.94%
|-
|style="background-color: " |
|align=left|Aleksandr Terentyev
|align=left|A Just Russia — For Truth
|
|10.45%
|-
|style="background-color:"|
|align=left|Aleksandr Andryushchenko
|align=left|Communists of Russia
|
|9.76%
|-
|style="background-color:"|
|align=left|Maksim Krayn
|align=left|Liberal Democratic Party
|
|5.46%
|-
|style="background-color:"|
|align=left|Aleksandra Tomashevich
|align=left|New People
|
|4.16%
|-
|style="background-color:"|
|align=left|Aleksandr Tretyakov
|align=left|Party of Pensioners
|
|3.33%
|-
|style="background-color:"|
|align=left|Andrey Tkachenko
|align=left|Yabloko
|
|2.11%
|-
|style="background:"| 
|align=left|Sergey Ubrayev
|align=left|Rodina
|
|1.14%
|-
| colspan="5" style="background-color:#E9E9E9;"|
|- style="font-weight:bold"
| colspan="3" style="text-align:left;" | Total
| 
| 100%
|-
| colspan="5" style="background-color:#E9E9E9;"|
|- style="font-weight:bold"
| colspan="4" |Source:
|
|}

Notes

References

Russian legislative constituencies
Politics of Altai Krai